Anna Sisková (born 1 July 2001) is a Czech tennis player.

Sisková has career-high WTA rankings of 236 in singles and 158 in doubles. She has won three singles titles and 15 doubles titles on tournaments of the ITF Women's Circuit.

Sisková won her biggest title-to-date at the 2021 ITS Cup, where she was winner of the doubles event, partnering Jessie Aney.

Grand Slam performance timelines

Singles

ITF Circuit finals

Singles: 9 (3 titles, 6 runner–ups)

Doubles: 27 (15 titles, 12 runner–ups)

References

External links
 
 

2001 births
Living people
Czech female tennis players
21st-century Czech women